Anthony G. Watson is a British business and technology executive, and human and LGBT rights activist. In November 2021, Watson founded The Bank of London, a clearing, correspondent and wholesale bank, serving as Chief Executive Officer. Since 2013 he has sat on the board of GLAAD. In April 2015, he joined the Bitcoin trading start-up Uphold.com as its president and Chief Executive Officer.

He was listed 19th in Fortune's 2014 "40 under 40" list, fourth in Financial Times' 2014 list of influential LGBT executives, and 10th in The Guardian's 2014 "World Pride Power List", where he was described as "one of the most influential gay men in the world."

Career 

A Christian who studied theology, Watson initially considered becoming a minister, but discovered he enjoyed working with technology while working part-time for AOL Ireland during his degree. As a result, he started working for First-e Bancorp (Europe's first internet bank), going on to take senior roles at Microsoft, CitiGroup and Unisys. Between 2006 and 2009, he was the senior vice president and global head of technology services at Wells Fargo, where he ran technology for the bank across 44 Counties.

Watson worked as chief information officer for Barclays' retail arm from 2009, overseeing the launch of several mobile apps including the bank's Pingit service for sending and receiving money, about which he said "The feedback we have had around Pingit in the media and on Twitter was amazing, we were in the top spot for a while with that launch, only porn stars get that sort of traffic." In interviews, he reported being responsible for a £3 billion annual IT budget.

In February 2014, Watson left Barclays to move from the UK to the USA, where in April 2014 he begin working as chief information officer for Nike. In that role he signed a significant deal with Juniper Networks, and completed a five-year road map for IT strategy at the company.

After 10 months at Nike, Watson left the company in December 2014. This was announced as being for "personal reasons." Business Insider and Fortune both quoted unnamed sources who explained he was dissatisfied with life in Portland, Oregon, where he lived in order to work at Nike's Beaverton headquarters. However Watson has stated neither Portland nor Beaverton contributed to his decision to leave.

Shortly after leaving Nike, Watson joined Uphold in April 2015 as its president and chief operating officer. The then six-month-old company allows customers to trade in Bitcoin and hold more stable investments (currency or commodities) that are denominated in Bitcoin. Watson has stated he believes the company will help make the financial system fairer, saying "I wanted to do something that is valuable for people broadly, not just in one industry. And what Uphold is looking to achieve really democratizes finance. It's going to help people all over the world. The financial system is inherently unfair—it's always the richest who have access, and the poorest don’t have access, or when they do, they have to pay astronomical rates."

Watson has also been a director of Digital Globe Services since 2013.

In November 2021, Watson founded The Bank of London, a clearing, correspondent and wholesale bank operating in the UK, USA and Europe. Watson had been working on developing the bank over 4 years. The bank launched on 30th November 2021 and in doing so became the UK's 6th clearing bank. Watson stated that "existing providers have failed to adequately serve business customers and says it [The Bank of London] plans to offer features including cheaper, faster and safer transactions".

Activism 

At Barclays, Watson was the co-chair of the bank's "global diversity & inclusion panel". In 2013 he became the first non-US citizen to join the board of directors for the LGBT charity GLAAD, and he is an ambassador for the LGBT charity Stonewall. He is a chair of the European Diversity Awards, as well as acting chair of the judges, and is a patron of the UK charity Diversity Role Models. He has spoken in schools about LGBT issues and careers.

Watson came out to his family at age 21, but did not come out at work until about six years later. The Guardian quoted him saying, "I remember being shocked by a colleague using the term 'filthy queer' in a meeting, so much so that I had to pull him aside and say, 'I'm gay, and you don't get to use that language here. If you want to use it at home, that's your call, but in this context, you don't get to use that language.' That's actually why I came out at the time. It's important that people take a stand on these issues."

Fortune has described Watson as "an outspoken gay rights activist," while The Guardian has described him as "one of the most influential gay men in the world."

Awards and recognition 

 The Telegraph 2015 "Out at Work" list of top 50 LGBT executives: ranked 4th.
 Fortune 2014 "40 under 40" list of the most influential young people in business: ranked 19th.
 Financial Times 2014 list of influential LGBT executives: ranked 4th.
 The Guardian 2014 "World Pride Power List" of the most influential LGBT people: ranked 10th.
 The Independent on Sunday 2014 "Rainbow List" of influential LGBT people: ranked 44th.
 CIO UK 2014  "CIO 100" list of transformative chief information officers: ranked 14th.
 Adcolor 2014 "Advocate" award for increasing awareness of LGBT causes within and without the communications industry.
 Financial Times 2013 "OUTstanding in Business List" of influential LGBT people: ranked 9th.
 The Guardian 2013 "World Pride Power List" of the most influential LGBT people: ranked 26th.
 The Independent on Sunday 2013 "Pink List" of influential LGBT people: ranked 66th.
 CIO UK 2013 "CIO 100" list of transformative chief information officers: ranked 6th.
 Out in the City 2013 readers' awards: Inspirational Role Model of the Year.
 The Guardian 2012 "World Pride Power List" of the most influential LGBT people: ranked 56th.
 The Independent on Sunday 2012 "Pink List" of influential LGBT people: ranked 60th.
 Abercrombie & Fitch 2012 "Diversity Champion of the Year" in the European Diversity Awards: shortlisted.

References

External links 
 

Businesspeople from London
Nike, Inc. people
Barclays people
Living people
1970s births
English LGBT businesspeople
English gay men
Gay businessmen
British chief executives
Chief information officers
21st-century Christians
LGBT Christians
English Christians
British LGBT rights activists
British expatriates in the United States
Chief operating officers
21st-century English LGBT people